Mpigi District is a district in Central Uganda. Like most other Ugandan districts, it is named after its 'main town', Mpigi.

Location
Mpigi District is bordered by Wakiso District to the north and east, Kalangala District to the south, Kalungu District to the southwest, Butambala District to the west and Mityana District to the northwest. The coordinates of the district are:00 14N, 32 20E.

Overview
In the 1970s Mpigi District comprised the Buganda Kingdom counties of Kyaddondo, Busiro, Mawokota, Butambala and Gomba. During the 1990s, Kyaddondo and Busiro were peeled off to form Wakiso District. In 2010, Gomba split off to form Gomba District and Butambala became Butambala District. Mawokota remained as the sole constituent of Mpigi District.

Population
In 1991, the district population was estimated at about 157,400. The next census in 2002 estimated the population of the district at about 187,800, with an annual growth rate of 1.4%. In 2012, the population of Mpigi District was estimated at approximately 215,500. The district is primarily a rural district, with only 8.4% of the population living in urban areas.

Education
Mpigi is one of the few areas in Uganda and likely the whole of Africa to have Humanist schools. The Uganda Humanist Schools Trust UHST sponsors 3 Humanist schools with the support of the International Humanist Ethical Union.

Economic activities
The major economic activity in Mpigi District is agriculture. The major crops include:

 Sweet potatoes
 Beans
 Cassava
 Maize
 Bananas
 Groundnuts
 Coffee
 Cotton
 Tomatoes
 Cabbage
 Onions
 Avocado

See also
 Mpigi
 Central Region, Uganda
 Districts of Uganda

References

External links
  Mpigi District Webpage
 Uganda Humanist Schools Trust
 Uganda Humanist Schools: A Golden Opportunity to Support a Vision!

 
Districts of Uganda
Central Region, Uganda
Lake Victoria